Steinke is a surname, and may refer to:

Alfred Steinke (1881-1945), German ice hockey player
Bill Steinke (contemporary), Canadian darts player
Brad Steinke (contemporary), American sportscaster
Darcey Steinke (b. 1964), American novelist and journalist
Gerhard Steinke (contemporary), German sound engineer
Gil Steinke (1919–1995), American football coach
Kersten Steinke (born 1958), German politician
Philipp Steinke (contemporary), German songwriter and musician
Rene Steinke (contemporary), American novelist and poet
René Steinke (b. 1963), German actor
Ronen Steinke (b. 1983), German author and journalist

de:Steinke